Several races are called the Grand Prix Americas:
For the CART event, see Grand Prix of Miami (open wheel racing)
For the ALMS event, see Grand Prix of Miami (sports car racing)

See also
 United States Grand Prix (disambiguation)
 American Grand Prix (disambiguation)